The 1982 Central Fidelity Banks International was a women's singles tennis tournament played on indoor carpet courts at the Robins Center in Richmond, Virginia in the United States. The event was part of the Category 4 tier of the Toyota Series that was part of the 1982 WTA Tour. It was the fourth edition of the tournament and was held from December 6 through December 12, 1982. Second-seeded Wendy Turnbull won the singles title and earned $23,000 first-prize money.

Finals

Singles
 Wendy Turnbull defeated  Tracy Austin 6–7(3–7), 6–4, 6–2
 It was Turnbull's 2nd singles title of the year and the 9th of her career.

Doubles
 Rosie Casals /  Candy Reynolds defeated  Jennifer Russell /  Virginia Ruzici 6–3, 6–4

Prize money

Notes

References

External links
 International Tennis Federation (ITF) tournament edition details 

Central Fidelity Banks International
Central Fidelity Banks International
Central Fidelity Banks International
Central Fidelity Banks International
Central Fidelity Banks International